The 2013 Sibiu Rally Romania, formally the 13. Sibiu Rally Romania, was the seventh round of the 2013 European Rally Championship season.

Results

Special stages

References

Sibiu
Sibiu
July 2013 sports events in Romania
Motorsport in Romania
Rally competitions in Romania